The Hoch Fulen is a mountain of the Glarus Alps, located east of Erstfeld in the Uri. It lies in the group north-west of the Gross Windgällen, between the Reuss valley and the Schächental.

References

External links
Hoch Fulen on Hikr

Mountains of Switzerland
Mountains of the canton of Uri
Mountains of the Alps